Alina Reh (born 23 May 1997) is a German middle- and long-distance runner. She won the bronze medal in the 10,000 metres at the 2018 European Athletics Championships. At the European U23 Championships, Reh earned silver for the 5000 metres in 2017 and silver in the event and gold for the 10,000 m in 2019. She took four individual medals at the European Cross Country Championships, including bronze in the senior race in 2021 and 2022.

Reh won silver for the 3000 m at the 2014 Summer Youth Olympics, and gold medals for the 3000 m and 5000 m at the 2015 European Junior Championships. She won several national titles.

She struggled with injuries for much of 2021 missing postponed 2020 Tokyo Olympics.

Achievements

International competitions

National championships
 German Athletics Championships
 5000 metres: 2015, 2020, 2022
 10,000 metres: 2019, 2022
 German Indoor Athletics Championships
 3000 metres: 2017

Personal bests
 1500 metres – 4:14.64 (Regensburg 2016)
 1500 metres indoor – 4:13.71 (Dortmund 2019)
 3000 metres – 9:05.07 (Nanjing 2014) 
 3000 metres indoor – 8:39.45 (Glasgow 2019)
 5000 metres – 15:04.10 (Stockholm 2019)
 10,000 metres – 31:19.87 (Essen 2019)
Road
 5 kilometres – 15:22 (Berlin 2020)
 10 kilometres – 31:23 (Berlin 2018)
 Half marathon – 1:09:31 (Cologne 2018)

References

External links

 

1997 births
Living people
People from Alb-Donau-Kreis
Sportspeople from Tübingen (region)
German female long-distance runners
German female middle-distance runners
Athletes (track and field) at the 2014 Summer Youth Olympics
World Athletics Championships athletes for Germany
German national athletics champions
21st-century German women